Dream Island (Ostrov mechty) is an amusement park in Moscow that opened 29 February 2020. It is the largest indoor theme park in Europe.

Development 
The park covers 300,000 square meters. During the construction of the park 150 acres of nature trees unique and rare animals and birds and plants on the peninsula were destroyed.  The appearance is in the style of a fairytale castle.

The value of investment is $1.5 billion. Construction of the park began in March 2016. Construction was halted in early 2017 for financial reasons but was re-financed and restarted by late 2017.

There are nine themed zones, including Hotel Transylvania licensed from Sony Pictures, the Smurfs, licensed from Belgian company IMPS, Teenage Mutant Ninja Turtles from Paramount, and Hello Kitty from Sanrio of Japan.

There are promenades resembling the streets of world capitals and famous cities, including Rome, with the Colosseum in miniature; Barcelona with Gaudi's buildings; and London. The park's 72 acres are covered by Europe's largest glass dome, to allow operation during Moscow's winters.

The cost of entrance for a family of four at the opening of the park is 11,000 rubles, or about US$142.

Attractions

Roller coasters

Thrill rides

References

External links

Amusement parks in Russia
Indoor amusement parks
Amusement parks opened in 2020
Buildings and structures in Moscow Oblast
2020 introductions